Pi Delta Psi is an Asian American-interest cultural fraternity founded at Binghamton University on . As of 2020, the organization listed over 3,000-lifetime members spanning 30 undergraduate chapters and 1 alumni chapter.

This organization is a member of the National APIDA Panhellenic Association (NAPA).

History

The fraternity's founding members were: 

After five years, the fraternity had grown too large for the informal Pi Delta Psi National Council to maintain. Thus in 1999, it was decided by the National Council to restructure itself in an effort to grow in proportion to the fraternity's expansion rate, standardize chapters nationwide, and increase inter-chapter cohesion. The National Council was also renamed the "National Executive Board" during that period.

After 25 years, Pi Delta Psi expanded to 31 campuses spanning fourteen states, including California, Colorado, Connecticut, Florida, Georgia, Maryland, Massachusetts, Minnesota, New Jersey, New York, Ohio, Pennsylvania, Virginia, and Washington, D.C.

Mission statement
Pi Delta Psi and its members seek to bring about Asian-American unity by breaking down cultural barriers amongst Asian communities by upholding and/or instilling the fraternity's pillars: academic achievement, cultural awareness, righteousness, friendship, and loyalty. Pi Delta Psi's mission statement also advocates an increase in education and awareness of Asian cultures as a means of overcoming racism.

National events

National Convention

Pi Delta Psi holds an annual National Convention in the August of each year. The National Convention is a formal 2-day meeting of members where the National Executive Board meets and discusses relevant fraternity issues with active members from all chapters. Discussed issues involve an overview of the fraternity, creating general goals, and national expansion. Cultural, professional, and/or leadership workshops are also held. The location of each year's National Convention is usually determined at the previous convention and changes annually.

National Winter Conference
Pi Delta Psi holds an annual National Winter Conference in January. The Winter Conference is a daylong leadership retreat where the National Executive Board meets and discusses relevant fraternity issues with representatives from each undergraduate chapter.  The event is typically held in the New York metropolitan area.

National Summer Weekend
Pi Delta Psi holds an annual National Summer Weekend during the month of July each year. The National Summer Weekend is a 2-3 day series of events that includes the National Summer BBQ, National Summer Conference, and National Summer Banquet.

The National Summer BBQ is normally held at Alley Pond Park in Queens, New York, and includes sporting events and chapter fundraising activities. The National Summer Conference is a private half-day event where the National Executive Board meets and discusses relevant fraternity issues with active chapter members. Elections for the following year's National Executive Board also take place during this event. The Conference is normally held in the New York metropolitan area.The National Summer Banquet is a formal dinner event for Pi Delta Psi members which is normally held near the location of the National Summer Conference. National announcements such as awards and scholarships are presented during this event.

Cultural awareness

At the chapter level, each chapter is required to host a set number of cultural events on campus each year depending on the chapter's size; failure to achieve this annual criterion will result in the chapter losing its chapter status.

Philanthropy

The March of Dimes was named as the national philanthropy of Pi Delta Psi for 2009; the fraternity remains an official team youth partner. Formerly, Pi Delta Psi's national philanthropy was the Big Brothers Big Sisters of America program. All chapters were expected to work closely with the Big Brothers program in their own campus community. At the Chapter level, each chapter was required to participate in a set number of philanthropy events each year depending on the chapter's size; failure to achieve this annual criteria results in the chapter having its status revoked.

Local chapter or member misconduct

Death of Michael Deng
On December 8, 2013, prospective member Chun Hsien "Michael" Deng died from brain trauma due to hazing during a pledge event held by the Baruch College chapter at a rented house in the Pocono Mountains in  Tunkhannock Township, Monroe County, Pennsylvania. Deng, 18, was a recent graduate of The Bronx High School of Science. Deng and three other pledges were blindfolded and wearing 30 lb. backpacks filled with sand while members of the fraternity tackled them and delivered repeated blows to their heads and bodies (known as “spearing”), in three stages lasting approximately 25 minutes each. During the final stage is when Deng suffered the injuries that later proved fatal. The ritual is known within the fraternity as "The Glass Ceiling," which was meant to represent how Asian-Americans struggle acclimating in the United States. Despite Deng becoming more unstable, slurring his speech and unable to walk, Kenny Kwan ran at a high speed and tackled Deng, his fraternity brothers failed to call for emergency help, instead dragging Deng inside, changing his clothes, and attempting to cover up the incident. This delayed Deng’s transport to and treatment at the hospital by more than two hours. Deng was ultimately driven to the hospital by three members of the fraternity. 

Andy Meng, the former National Executive President for Pi Delta Psi initially published a statement which read in part that the incident happened during "an unsanctioned event that was strictly prohibited by our organization." However, when Deng lost consciousness his fraternity brothers called Andy Meng who allegedly told them to conceal any evidence of the fraternity before calling the authorities. Prosecutors later discovered text messages between Meng and local chapter member Charles Lai throughout the morning of December 8, 2013. One such message from Meng to Lai asked “were you spearing?” The texts demonstrated that Meng was aware of the outing as well as the injuries to Deng. Meng directed members of the local fraternity to cover up what had happened, hide various items of evidence, and ensure that the national fraternity was not connected in any way to the outing or Deng’s injuries. 

After investigating the incident, the National Pi Delta Psi fraternity revoked its affiliation with the Baruch chapter.  Baruch College banned the fraternity from ever returning to its campus. In February 2014, Deng’s death was ruled a homicide, and the Monroe County district attorney stated that they expected to file charges after their investigation was completed. In addition, Deng's parent's filed a civil lawsuit against the National Pi Delta Psi fraternity, the Baruch chapter of Pi Delta Psi, and various fraternity members including Mr. Meng, who is the younger brother of U.S. representative Grace Meng. 

On September 14, 2015, charges were filed against 37 individuals, including five for third-degree murder. The Monroe County District Attorney’s Office brought charges against the individual defendants in various stages and according to their culpability for Deng’s death. Prosecutors brought charges of hazing, felony hindering apprehension, aggravated assault, criminal conspiracy and other related misdemeanors and felonies against 32 of the fraternity members. Andrew Meng faced charges of hazing, conspiracy and hindering apprehension.  Kenny Kwan, Charles Lai, Raymond Lam, Sam Liao, and Sheldon Wong were each charged with third-degree murder and 

In January, 2017, the first of the 37 men went on trial. On the second day of his trial, Ka-Wing Yuen pled guilty to charges of conspiracy to hinder apprehension by evidence tampering, a third-degree felony, and conspiracy to commit hazing, a misdemeanor. Yuen was sentenced to 5 years probation and 100 hours of community service. In addition, Yuen was ordered to pay a $1,000 fine.

On November 28-29, 2017, twenty-nine fraternity members, including Meng, reached plea bargains resulting in each pleading guilty to various misdemeanor crimes including hindering apprehension, simple assault, hazing, and conspiracy. All were sentenced to varying terms of probation. Meng received 36 months of probation. 

On October 29, 2015, Kenny Kwan, Charles Lai, Raymond Lam, Daniel Li, and Sheldon Wong and the Pi Delta Psi Fraternity were charged with third-degree murder (involuntary manslaughter), aggravated assault, simple assault, hindering apprehension, hazing and conspiracy. Kwan and Lai were also each charged with  possession of drug paraphernalia and possession of a controlled substance.   In a surprising turn of events, at a November 30, 2015 hearing, Daniel Li took the stand and testified for the Commonwealth in exchange for a deal resulting in lesser charges. His testimony revealed the brutal events leading to Deng’s death and the elaborate cover-up that followed. Not surprisingly, on January 8, 2018, Kwan, Lai, Lam, and Wong pleaded guilty to voluntary manslaughter, hindering apprehension and other charges. Lam and Wong were each sentenced to 10 to 24 months in jail. Kwan received 12 to 24 months. Lai was sentenced to time served, as he had failed to make bail and had been in jail for 342 days at the time of sentencing.

The Pi Delta Psi fraternity was the only defendant that had a jury trial. After a 7-day trial, a jury convicted the fraternity of aggravated assault, involuntary manslaughter, hazing, hindering apprehension and conspiracy. The jury found the fraternity not guilty of the most serious crimes -  third-degree murder and voluntary manslaughter. At sentencing, Monroe County President Judge Margherita Patti-Worthington imposed a $112,500 fine and banned the national fraternity from operating in the state for ten years, with an additional 10 years’ probation. The Pennsylvania Superior Court upheld the fine and probation, but ruled that the lower court did not have the authority to bar the fraternity from operating throughout Pennsylvania. The Supreme Court of Pennsylvania declined to hear the matter further, so the Superior Court ruling stands.

Chapters
These are the chapters of Pi Delta Psi. Active chapters and colonies are noted in bold, and inactive chapters are noted in italics.

Notes

References

1994 establishments in New York (state)
Asian-American culture in New York (state)
Asian-American fraternities and sororities
Fraternities and sororities in the United States
Student organizations established in 1994